The Super Bowl of Poker (also known as Amarillo Slim's Super Bowl of Poker or SBOP) was the second most prestigious poker tournament in the world during the 1980s.  While the World Series of Poker was already drawing larger crowds as more and more amateurs sought it out, the SBOP "was an affair limited almost exclusively to pros and hard-core amateurs."

Prior to 1979, the only high dollar tournament a person could enter was the WSOP.  1972 WSOP Main Event Champion and outspoken ambassador for poker Amarillo Slim saw this as an opportunity.  "The World Series of Poker was so successful that everybody wanted more than one tournament," he said.  Slim called upon his connections and friendships with poker's elite to start a new tournament in the February 1979.  Before the SBOP had developed a reputation of its own, many of the most respected names in poker attended the tournament "more to support Slim and take advantage of the very fat cash games the event would obviously inspire."  Slim modelled his SBOP after the WSOP with several events and a $10,000 Texas Hold'em Main Event.

One of the principal differences between the WSOP and the SBOP was the prize structure.  The WSOP's prize structure was flat ensuring more people received smaller pieces of the prize pool.  The SBOP typically used a 60-30-10 payout structure.  In other words, only the first three places received money and generally in the ratio of 60% to first place, 30% to second place, and 10% to third.  This payment schedule predominated the SBOP for the first 5 years of the event, but as the event grew the number of payouts increased while keeping the payout schedule top heavy.

1990 Tournament

The 1990 SBOP had arguably one of the toughest final tables ever assembled.  Four of the final six players (Jack Keller, Stu Ungar, T. J. Cloutier, and Chip Reese) have all been inducted into the Poker Hall of Fame.  A fifth player, Hamid Dastmalchi won the WSOP Main Event in 1992.  Between the five of them, they have acquired 20 WSOP bracelets.  T. J. Cloutier did at the SBOP what he has failed to do at the WSOP, despite making 4 WSOP Main Event Final tables, by winning the SBOP Main Event.  Billy Baxter won the Deuce To Seven Lowball.  Deuce to Seven is the format type where Baxter has won five WSOP bracelets.  Baxter had finished in second place in various SBOP Deuce to Seven Lowball five times and third once.

Hoyt Corkins a two time bracelet and one time World Poker Tour winner won his first major tournament at the 1990 SBOP.

Key

Event 1: $ 400 7 Card Stud (Ladies)

 Number of buy-ins: 63
 Total prize pool: $19,680
 Number of payouts: 18
 Reference:

Event 2: $ 500 Limit Hold'em

 Number of buy-ins: 292
 Total prize pool: Unknown
 Number of payouts: 5
 Reference:

Event 3: $ 500 Limit 7 Card Stud

 Number of buy-ins: 268
 Total prize pool: Unknown
 Number of payouts: Unknown
 Reference:

Event 4: $ 1,000 7 Card Stud Hi/Lo

 Number of buy-ins: 119
 Total prize pool: $119,000
 Number of payouts: Unknown
 Reference:

Event 5: $ 1,000 7 Card Razz

 Number of buy-ins: 119
 Total prize pool: $119,000
 Number of payouts: Unknown
 Reference:

Event : $ 200 Pot Limit Omaha with Rebuys

 Number of buy-ins: Unknown
 Total prize pool: Unknown
 Number of payouts: Unknown
 Reference:

Event 7: $ 1,000 7 Card Stud

 Number of buy-ins: 140
 Total prize pool: $140,000
 Number of payouts: Unknown
 Reference:

Event 8: $ 200 No Limit Hold'em with Rebuys

 Number of buy-ins: 219
 Total prize pool: $220,300
 Number of payouts: 6
 Reference:

Event 9: $ 1,000 Limit Hold'em

 Number of buy-ins: 170
 Total prize pool: $170,000
 Number of payouts: 18
 Reference:

Event 10: $ 200 Limit Omaha with Rebuys

 Number of buy-ins: 166
 Total prize pool: Unknown
 Number of payouts: 18
 Reference:

Event 11: $ 1,500 Limit 7 Card Stud

 Number of buy-ins: 102
 Total prize pool: $153,000
 Number of payouts: 16
 Reference:

Event 11: Deuce To 7 Lowball

 Number of buy-ins: 18
 Total prize pool: $87,500
 Number of payouts: 4
 Reference:

Event 12: $ 10,000 No Limit Hold'em

 Number of buy-ins: 48
 Total prize pool: $480,000
 Number of payouts: 7
 Reference:

References

Super Bowl of Poker
1990 in poker